Liaoceratops, meaning "Liaoning horned face", is a ceratopsian dinosaur believed to be an early relative of the horned ceratopsids. It lived in the Early Cretaceous, 126 million years ago. It was discovered in China by a team of American and Chinese scientists. Liaoceratops was much smaller than its later relatives, but offers a glimpse into the early evolution of this group of dinosaurs.

Discoveries and naming
Liaoceratops was discovered in the famous Liaoning Province of China, where several fossils of feathered dinosaurs have also been collected.
The type species Liaoceratops yanzigouensis was in 2002 named and described by Xu Xing, Peter Makovicky, Wang Xiaolin, Mark Norell and You Hailu. The generic name is derived from Liaoning and the Greek keras, "horn" and ops, "face". The specific name refers to the town Yanzigou.

The holotype IVPP V12738 has been found in the Yixian Formation dating from the Barremian. These beds have also yielded fossil insects, fossils of ginkgo trees, and many other dinosaurs, including the early troodontid Sinovenator, also described by Makovicky later in 2002.

"This area is yielding extremely important information on the evolution of dinosaurs, mammals, insects, and flowering plants. I hope to find even more primitive specimens than Liaoceratops," Peter Makovicky said.

The holotype consists of an almost complete skull. As paratype specimen IVPP V12633 has been referred, the skull of a juvenile. In 2007 another skull, CAGS-IG-VD-002, of an even younger individual was referred. This lacked the skull roof, which has been explained as the result of a predator opening the braincase to eat the contents.

Description and classification
The holotype skull measures of 154 millimetres in length, weighing an estimated seven pounds and possessing only jugal horns and a small skull frill, lacking the orbital horns and true neck shield that characterized later ceratopsians. However, these features help understand a major split in the evolution of ceratopsians. Long before the familiar Triceratops evolved in North America, the ceratopsian lineage branched into two lines: the neoceratopsians, the main lineage that includes the recognizable horned and frilled forms, and of which Liaoceratops in 2002 was the most basal known member, and the Psittacosauridae, a radiation of smaller, parrot-beaked dinosaurs.

"Liaoceratops gives us a great window on the early evolution of horned dinosaurs and tells us that Triceratops and its relatives evolved from very small Asian ceratopsians. This small, primitive dinosaur is actually more interesting to science in many ways than its larger, more famous relatives because it teaches us more about evolution. Basal dinosaurs are critical because they help us to tie different groups of dinosaurs together and map out evolutionary patterns," said Peter Makovicky, Curator of Dinosaurs at the Field Museum in Chicago and a co-author of the paper describing the dinosaur.

"Liaoceratops establishes that this split occurred no later than the earliest part of the Cretaceous Period. Also, it indicates that ceratopsians acquired some of their distinctive features earlier and more rapidly than was previously recognized," Makovicky said.

Function of the horns and frill
Ironically, the diminutive Liaoceratops may also help scientists understand the roles of horns and frills in ceratopsian dinosaurs. First thought of as offensive or defensive organs, these structures are seen by many paleontologists today as display devices used in species recognition and to attract mates. Liaoceratops has a small jugal horn facing sideways under and behind each of its eyes. As this structure is relatively small and light, Makovicky believed that it was a display organ and had no purpose in defense.

See also

 Timeline of ceratopsian research

Notes

External links
 Liaoceratops in the Dino Directory

Early Cretaceous dinosaurs of Asia
Neoceratopsians
Yixian fauna
Taxa named by Xu Xing
Taxa named by Mark Norell
Fossil taxa described in 2002
Ornithischian genera